Jacob Hoke (March 17, 1825 – December 26, 1893) was a 19th-century American merchant and businessman in Chambersburg, Pennsylvania, whose personal observations and diary entries formed the basis for one of the earliest classic accounts of the Gettysburg Campaign during the American Civil War. He was also a prolific writer of widely circulated religious materials for the United Brethren Church.

Hoke was born in McConnellsburg, Pennsylvania, to Henry and Sarah (Eyster) Hoke. He was educated in the local schools and, from the age of twelve until May 1841, clerked in a country store. He moved to Chambersburg, where he engaged in a series of business ventures that led to enough capital to open his own dry goods store on Chambersburg's town square. During the early part of the Civil War, he assisted in caring for the wounded from the Battle of Antietam in the autumn of 1862.

Hoke lived on the second floor above his shop. As the Confederate Army began invading the town in late June 1863, he had an excellent vantage point to observe and watch the movements of the Southern soldiers. For the next two weeks, Confederates occupied the town, and much of the Army of Northern Virginia passed within view of Hoke. In the summer of 1864, he again was in a position to witness the Civil War in his home town when much of Chambersburg was burned by Confederate cavalry under John McCausland operating under the orders of Maj. Gen. Jubal A. Early.

In 1884, Hoke integrated his memories, notes, observations, and outside sources into a pamphlet he entitled "Reminiscences of the War." Three years later, he produced a larger, more detailed work, The Great Invasion of 1863, or, General Lee in Pennsylvania. Published in Dayton, Ohio, the book has become a standard reference work for a first-hand account of the two Confederate incursions into south-central Pennsylvania.

For many years, Hoke was the president of the Franklin County Bible Society, and he served on several church-related boards and committees, including chairing the Board of Missions for the national United Brethren Church. He married twice, but had no children.

References
 Biographical Annals of Franklin County, Pennsylvania, Volume 1. Reprinted by Heritage Books, 
 Hoke, Jacob, The Great Invasion of 1863, or, General Lee in Pennsylvania.... Dayton, Ohio : W. J. Shuey, 1887.

Notes

Historians of the American Civil War
American merchants
People from Chambersburg, Pennsylvania
1825 births
1893 deaths
People from Fulton County, Pennsylvania
19th-century American businesspeople